Painted Lady is a  mountain summit located in Fresno County, California.

Description
Access to the peak is possible via the John Muir Trail which crosses Glen Pass one mile to the southwest of the peak. The first ascent of the summit was made in 1931 by Robert Owen.

Climate
According to the Köppen climate classification system, Painted Lady is located in an alpine climate zone. Most weather fronts originate in the Pacific Ocean, and travel east toward the Sierra Nevada mountains. As fronts approach, they are forced upward by the peaks (orographic lift), causing them to drop their moisture in the form of rain or snowfall onto the range. Precipitation runoff from the peak drains into Rae Lakes.

See also
 
 Painted Lady (disambiguation)

Gallery

References

External links
 Weather forecast: Painted Lady

Mountains of Fresno County, California
Mountains of Kings Canyon National Park
North American 3000 m summits
Mountains of Northern California
Sierra Nevada (United States)
Mountains of the Sierra Nevada (United States)